Alexander Belsyre, D.D. was an English priest and academic in the mid 16th-century. 

A Fellow of New College, Oxford, he was the first President of St John's College, Oxford, although he would be deprived of his office by the college's founder, Sir Thomas White, for financial dishonesty and perjury in c. 1559. He held Livings at  Colerne, Osney and  Hanborough. He died on 13 July 1567.

References

Fellows of New College, Oxford
Presidents of St John's College, Oxford
16th-century English people
1567 deaths